Clostridium saccharoperbutylacetonicum is an indole and notably butanol-producing bacterium, with the type strain N1-4 (HMT) (= ATCC 27021T). Its genome has been sequenced.

References

Further reading

External links
 
 LPSN
 Type strain of Clostridium saccharoperbutylacetonicum at BacDive -  the Bacterial Diversity Metadatabase

Gram-positive bacteria
Bacteria described in 2001
saccharoperbutylacetonicum